The 1991 World Marathon Cup was the fourth edition of the World Marathon Cup of athletics and were held in London, United Kingdom. The competition was held jointly with the annual London Marathon on 21 April.

Results

Individual men

Individual women

References

Results
IAAF World Cup. Association of Road Racing Statisticians. Retrieved 2018-03-30.

External links
 IAAF web site

World Marathon Cup
World
1991 in British sport
Marathons in the United Kingdom
International athletics competitions hosted by England
International sports competitions in London